Vito Damiano (born 23 November 1952 in Trapani) is an Italian politician.

He was appointed generale di brigata of the Carabinieri in 2007 and served as Mayor of Trapani from 2012 to 2017.

See also
2012 Italian local elections
List of mayors of Trapani

References

External links

Mayors of places in Sicily
People from Trapani
1952 births
Living people